St. Andrew's Hall may refer to:

Australia 
 St Andrews Church Hall, Indooroopilly, in Brisbane, Queensland
 St Andrew's Church Hall, Toogoolawah, a church hall in Toogoolawah, Queensland
St Andrew's Hall, Parkville, a residential training community in Melbourne for members of CMS Australia.

Canada 
 St. Andrew's Market and Playground, a park in Toronto

Singapore 
 St. Andrew's Hall, Singapore a 12-story hostel for 600 students at St, Andrew's School, Singapore

United Kingdom 
 St. Andrew's and Blackfriars' Hall, Norwich, a fourteenth-century friary complex, now a concert and functions venue in Norwich

United States 
 St. Andrew's Hall, Charleston, a former public building in Charleston, South Carolina
 Saint Andrew's Hall, Detroit, a music venue in Detroit, Michigan

Other uses 
 'St. Andrew's Hall', a song on the album 'Nico' by American rock band Blind Melon